Mueang Kaeo is a tambon (subdistrict) of Mae Rim District, in Chiang Mai Province, Thailand. In 2005 it had a population of 5,423 people. The tambon contains nine villages.

References

External links
Website of TAO Mueang Kaeo (Thai)

Tambon of Chiang Mai province
Populated places in Chiang Mai province